Mary Ann Corinna Howard Sieghart (born 6 August 1961) is an English author, journalist, radio presenter and former assistant editor of The Times, where she wrote columns about politics, social affairs and life in general. She has also written a weekly political column in The Independent. Her best-selling book, The Authority Gap: Why Women Are Still Taken Less Seriously Than Men, and What We Can Do About It, was published by Transworld/Doubleday in July 2021.

On BBC Radio 4, she has been a presenter of Start the Week and has also presented Fallout, Analysis, Profile, One to One and Beyond Westminster, as well as many one-off documentaries. She is a visiting professor at King's College London and chaired the Social Market Foundation, an independent think tank, from 2010 to 2020. She has been a non-executive director of the Ofcom Content Board, a member of the Tate Modern Council, and is currently a Non-Executive Director of the Guardian Media Group, Chair of the Investment Committee of The Scott Trust (owner of The Guardian and The Observer) and non-executive director of two large FTSE investment trusts: Pantheon International and The Merchants Trust. She is Chair of Judges for the Women's Prize for Fiction 2022. In 2018, she was named as one of the Female FTSE 100 Women to Watch.

She was appointed a Visiting Fellow of All Souls College, Oxford, for the academic year 2018–19, where she researched The Authority Gap. She has since been an Associate Member of Nuffield College, Oxford (2019–20) and a Senior Academic Visitor at Oriel College, Oxford (2020-21). She is now a visiting professor at King's College London.

Personal life
Sieghart was born in Hammersmith, London in 1961, the daughter of Paul Sieghart, a human rights lawyer, campaigner, broadcaster and author, and Felicity Ann Olga Howard (née Baer), chairman of the National Association for Gifted Children, magistrate and later managing director of the Aldeburgh Cinema. Her older brother is William Sieghart. She attended Cobham Hall School and Bedales School. She won a scholarship to Wadham College, Oxford, when she was 16, and graduated with a first-class degree in Philosophy, politics and economics in 1982.

Sieghart suffers from prosopagnosia, which makes it difficult to recognize familiar faces. Her mother, husband, and one of her children suffer from the same condition.

Career
Sieghart's abilities were admired by Bill Deedes. Deedes hired her to work at The Daily Telegraph during the 1980 university summer vacation, where she spent time sub-editing, working on the "Peterborough" column and on features. She returned for subsequent vacations and again took on various roles, including writing some leaders. Deedes notes that "Let loose on the leader page, Mary Ann wove a sometimes startling liberal thread through the Daily Telegraph's blue tapestry." He offered her a job on graduation but simultaneously advised her to apply elsewhere because the Daily Telegraph was in financial trouble.

After Oxford, Sieghart joined the Financial Times, where she became Eurobond Correspondent and then a Lex columnist. She spent a summer in 1984 working for The Washington Post, as the Laurence Stern Fellow. From the FT, she was recruited to be City Editor of Today newspaper at its launch in 1986. When it was taken over by Tiny Rowland, she moved to The Economist to be Political Correspondent. She also presented The World This Week on Channel 4.

In 1988, she joined The Times, as editor of the comment pages. During her time there, she was also Arts Editor, Chief Political leader-writer and acting editor of the paper on Mondays. In 1995, she chaired the revival of The Brains Trust on BBC2.

In 2003, Bill Hagerty, editor of the British Journalism Review, described Sieghart as "very talented" but criticised her assumption that broadsheet journalism in newspapers such as The Times was intrinsically better or more effective than tabloid journalism. In 2007, she left The Times to pursue a portfolio career. From 2010 to 2012, she wrote the main opinion column in The Independent on Mondays.

Sieghart is a regular broadcaster. She was an occasional presenter of Start the Week on Radio 4 and presented Newshour on the BBC World Service from 2008 to 2010: she has also presented Analysis, Fallout, Profile, One to One and Beyond Westminster on Radio 4. She has often appeared on programmes such as Question Time, Any Questions, Newsnight, Today, The World Tonight and Woman's Hour. She was a regular co-presenter of Start the Week during the time Melvyn Bragg was the programme's main presenter and has been a guest presenter of The Week in Westminster and Dispatch Box.

Other activities

Sieghart is visiting professor at King's College London, Non-Executive Director of the Guardian Media Group, chair of the investment committee of the Scott Trust, and a non-executive director of Pantheon International and The Merchants Trust. She is Chair of Judges of the Women's Prize for Fiction 2022. Until recently, she was chair of the Social Market Foundation, and also sat on the boards of the Henderson Smaller Companies Investment Trust, DLN Digital Ltd, the Council of Tate Modern and the Content Board of Ofcom. She is senior trustee of the Kennedy Memorial Trust and has previously served as a trustee of the Radcliffe Trust, Heritage Lottery Fund, steering committee member of the No Campaign and New Europe, member of the Advisory Board of the Social Studies Faculty at Oxford University and other voluntary posts.

References

External links
Official website
  (in conversation with Tracey Matisak, broadcast journalist formerly of WTXF-TV)
  (hosted by Cara Santa Maria)
  (in conversation with Councillor Alison Jenner, civil parish of Cumnor in Oxfordshire)

1961 births
Alumni of Wadham College, Oxford
English columnists
English journalists
English radio presenters
Living people
People educated at Bedales School
People educated at Cobham Hall School
People from West Kensington
The Daily Telegraph people
The Times people
Mary Ann Sieghart